Acacia rhodoxylon, also known as rosewood, ringy rosewood or spear wattle, is a tree belonging to the genus Acacia and the subgenus Juliflorae that is native to north eastern Australia.

Description
The stem as well as the branches are usually fluted in appearance. The heartwood is a deep dark brown to red brown colour while the lighter sapwood is creamy white. It has dark brown to grey coloured bark that peels off in small curved flakes resembling to minni ritchi type species. It has resinous and glabrous branchlets that are angled upwards. Like most species of Acacia it has phyllodes rather than true leaves. The glabrous and coriaceous evergreen phyllodes are quite resinous when young. They have a narrowly elliptic to oblanceolate shape and are usually inequilateral with a convex upper margin and a straight lower margin and can be shallowly sickle shaped. It flowers sporadically throughout the year producing yellow coloured flowers. After flowering glabrous, thinly coriaceous-crustaceous seed pods form that are slightly resinous.

Taxonomy
The species was first formally described by the botanist Joseph Maiden in 1920 as part of the work Notes on Acacias, with descriptions of new species as published in the Journal and Proceedings of the Royal Society of New South Wales. It was reclassified as Racosperma rhodoxylon in 1987 by Leslie Pedley and then transferred back to genus Acacia in 2001.

Distribution
It is endemic along the east coast of central Queensland where it is found from around Eidsvold in the south to around Clermont in the north with another disjunct population near Mount Garnett further north where it is a part of Eucalyptus woodland communities. It is often situated in hilly areas or undulating plains in the eastern part of the brigalow belt where it grows in skeletal sandy to clay soils with poor fertility where it is a part of open forest.

Uses
The tree produces a quality and attractive timber but was historically used for fencing as the wood is termite resistant. It has decorative uses as a turned wood, in xylophones and for parts of violins as a substitute for ebony and in sporting goods requiring straight grained timber.

See also
List of Acacia species

References

rhodoxylon
Flora of Queensland
Taxa named by Joseph Maiden
Plants described in 1920